Danfeng County is a county of Shangluo, Shaanxi, China, has an area of  and a population of 300,000 as of 2004.

Administrative divisions
Danfeng County has 1 subdistrict and 9 towns.
1 subdistrict
 Longjuzhai

9 townships
 Dihua
 Siping
 Tumen
 Zhulinguan
 Wuguan
 Tieyupu
 Luanzhuang
 Caichuan
 Yuling

Climate

Transport
China National Highway 312

References

County-level divisions of Shaanxi
Shangluo